The 464th Bombardment Squadron is an inactive United States Air Force unit.  Its last assignment was with 382d Bombardment Group at Camp Anza, California, where it was inactivated on 4 January 1946.  From 1942 the squadron served as a replacement training unit for heavy bomber aircrews.  It was inactivated in the spring of 1944 in a general reorganization of Army Air Forces training units.  The squadron was activated again in 1944 as a Boeing B-29 Superfortress unit.

History

Heavy bomber replacement training
The 464th Bombardment Squadron was first activated in July 1942 at Salt Lake City Army Air Base, Utah as one of the original squadrons of the 331st Bombardment Group.  In September it moved to Casper Army Air Field, where it conducted Boeing B-17 Flying Fortress replacement training until 1943, when it converted to the Consolidated B-24 Liberator.  Replacement training units were oversized units which trained aircrews prior to their deployment to combat theaters. However, the Army Air Forces found that standard military units, based on relatively inflexible tables of organization, were not proving to be well adapted to the training mission.  Accordingly, it adopted a more functional system in which each base was organized into a separate numbered unit, while the groups and squadrons acting as replacement training units were disbanded or inactivated. This resulted in the 462d, along with other units at Casper, being inactivated in the spring of 1944 and being replaced by the 211th AAF Base Unit (Combat Crew Training Station, Heavy), which assumed the 331st Group's mission, personnel, and equipment.

Very heavy bomber operations
Redesignated as a B-29 Superfortress very heavy bombardment Squadron in August 1944; trained under Second Air Force.  Training considerably delayed due to equipment shortages, received B-29 aircraft in Salina, Kansas in late spring 1945.  Ground echelon deployed to Northern Mariana Islands by ship in early August 1945; air echelon remained at last training base in Kansas after Japanese Capitulation.  Ground echelon remained in Marianas supporting other units aircraft and demobilization; air echelon demobilized with new B-29 aircraft remaining in Kansas, eventually being assigned to postwar units.  Entire unit inactivated by December 1945.

Lineage
 Constituted 464th Bombardment Squadron (Heavy) on 1 July 1942
 Activated on 6 July 1942
 Inactivated on 1 April 1944
 Redesignated 464th Bombardment Squadron, Very Heavy on 4 August 1944
 Activated on 19 September 1944
 Inactivated on 4 January 1946

Assignments
 331st Bombardment Group, 6 July 1942 – 1 April 1944
 382d Bombardment Group, 19 September 1944 – 4 January 1946

Stations
 Salt Lake City Army Air Base, Utah, 6 July 1942
 Casper Army Air Field, Wyoming, 15 September 1942 – 1 April 1944
 Dalhart Army Air Field, Texas, 19 September 1944
 Smoky Hill Army Air Field, Kansas, 11 December 1944 – 1 August 1945
 Guam, 8 September 1945 (ground echelon only; air echelon remained in US until inactivation)
 Tinian, c. Oct-15 December 1945 (ground echelon only)
 Camp Anza, California, 28 December 1945 – 4 January 1946

Aircraft
 Combination of B-17 Flying Fortress, B-24 Liberator, and B-25 Mitchell used for training, 1944–1945
 B-29 Superfortress,  Received in late spring, 1945.

References

 Notes

Bibliography

External links
 Brigadier General Lawrence A. Fowler biography

Strategic bombing squadrons of the United States Army Air Forces
Military units and formations established in 1942